Revolution Health Group was a United States-based corporation founded in July 2005 by Steve Case. 

Revolution Health Group was one of three companies in the Revolution LLC group of companies.

On October 25, 2007, the company dismissed 60 employees, or a quarter of its work-force, ostensibly as part of a restructuring.

On October 3, 2008, Revolution Health announced that it would merge with Waterfront Media in a deal valued at $300 million.

References 

American health websites
Internet properties established in 2005
2008 disestablishments in Washington, D.C.
Internet properties disestablished in 2008